Della Herbst (born February 26, 1935) was an American politician in the state of Wyoming. She served in the Wyoming House of Representatives  and Wyoming State Senate as a member of the Democratic party. A homemaker, she was married to John Herbst. She was Mayor of Sheridan, Wyoming from 1993 to 1996.

References

1935 births
Living people
Democratic Party members of the Wyoming House of Representatives
Democratic Party Wyoming state senators
Mayors of places in Wyoming
People from Lake of the Woods County, Minnesota
People from Sheridan, Wyoming
Women state legislators in Wyoming
21st-century American women